Spragueville is a city in Jackson County, Iowa, United States. The population was 92 at the time of the 2020 census.

History
Spragueville is named for an early settler called Sprague, who arrived there in 1841 and established a gristmill.

Geography
Spragueville is located at  (42.075500, -90.430023).

Demographics

2010 census
As of the census of 2010, there were 81 people, 37 households, and 20 families living in the city. The racial makeup of the city was 100.0% White. Hispanic or Latino of any race were 2.5% of the population.

There were 37 households, of which 21.6% had children under the age of 18 living with them, 37.8% were married couples living together, 13.5% had a female householder with no husband present, 2.7% had a male householder with no wife present, and 45.9% were non-families. 40.5% of all households were made up of individuals, and 21.6% had someone living alone who was 65 years of age or older. The average household size was 2.19 and the average family size was 3.05.

The median age in the city was 39.8 years. 25.9% of residents were under the age of 18; 6.1% were between the ages of 18 and 24; 27.1% were from 25 to 44; 20.9% were from 45 to 64; and 19.8% were 65 years of age or older. The gender makeup of the city was 56.8% male and 43.2% female.

2000 census
As of the census of 2000, there were 89 people, 42 households, and 29 families living in the city. The racial makeup of the city was 97.75% White, 1.12% Native American, and 1.12% from two or more races. Hispanic or Latino of any race were 2.25% of the population.

There were 42 households, out of which 19.0% had children under the age of 18 living with them, 45.2% were married couples living together, 19.0% had a female householder with no husband present, and 28.6% were non-families. 26.2% of all households were made up of individuals, and 14.3% had someone living alone who was 65 years of age or older. The average household size was 2.12 and the average family size was 2.53.

In the city, the population was spread out, with 15.7% under the age of 18, 13.5% from 18 to 24, 19.1% from 25 to 44, 27.0% from 45 to 64, and 24.7% who were 65 years of age or older. The median age was 48 years. For every 100 females, there were 107.0 males. For every 100 females age 18 and over, there were 92.3 males.

The median income for a household in the city was $28,750, and the median income for a family was $24,688. Males had a median income of $28,125 versus $28,750 for females. The per capita income for the city was $14,906. There were 16.0% of families and 15.9% of the population living below the poverty line, including 18.2% of under eighteens and 55.6% of those over 64.

Education
Spragueville is a part of the Easton Valley Community School District, formed in 2013 by the merger of the East Central Community School District and the Preston Community School District.

References

Cities in Jackson County, Iowa
Cities in Iowa
1841 establishments in Iowa Territory